Diego Pereira Brandão (born 27 May 1987) is a Brazilian mixed martial artist currently competing in the Lightweight division. A professional since 2005, he formerly competed for the UFC, RIZIN, and Fight Nights Global. He was the winner of Spike TV's The Ultimate Fighter: Team Bisping vs. Team Miller.

Mixed martial arts career

Early career
Brandão made his MMA debut against Michel Bastos, winning via submission. He went 3-1 before fighting against UFC veteran Ronys Torres. He lost the fight by TKO due to punches. He then fought longtime UFC veteran Brian Foster and won via KO in the first round. Following the contest he won 6 and lost four of his next ten fights, with 3 wins by KO, 2 by submission and 1 by decision, before signing with the UFC.

Brandão later became a member of Jackson's MMA in Albuquerque, New Mexico.

The Ultimate Fighter
In 2011, Brandão signed with the UFC to compete on The Ultimate Fighter: Team Bisping vs. Team Miller. In the first episode, Brandão fought Jesse Newell to gain entry into the Ultimate Fighter house. Brandão quickly defeated Newell via first round knockout. He was the number one featherweight pick for Team Bisping.

Brandão proved to be a loose cannon with confrontations with Marcus Brimage and Steven Siler. In the fifth episode it was announced that he would fight Siler on episode six. In this fight Diego charged out of the gate with a flying knee and knocked Siler unconscious 30 seconds into the first round with a left hook. With this win he advanced to the semi finals to fight former WEC fighter, Bryan Caraway. Brandão defeated Caraway via KO due to a flying knee and follow up punches late in the first round. With the win over Caraway, Brandão moved on to the finale against Dennis Bermudez.

Ultimate Fighting Championship
Brandão officially made his UFC debut on 3 December 2011, at The Ultimate Fighter 14 Finale against Dennis Bermudez to determine the first ever featherweight winner of The Ultimate Fighter 14. After a back-and-forth first round Brandão was knocked down and hit with heavy shots on the ground until he caught Bermudez with an armbar, and quickly forced the tapout. With his performance, Brandão was awarded Fight of the Night andSubmission of the Night honors, giving him a total of $80,000 in bonuses. During the post-fight interview Diego proclaimed of his mother; "The only thing on my mind [is to] buy her [a] house".

Brandão fought Darren Elkins on 26 May 2012, at UFC 146. Brandão lost the fight via unanimous decision.

Brandão fought and defeated Joey Gambino on 13 October 2012, at UFC 153 via unanimous decision.

Brandão faced Pablo Garza on 6 April 2013, at UFC on Fuel TV 9. Brandão defeated Garza on UFC on FUEL TV 9 via first round submission with an arm triangle choke.

Brandão faced Daniel Pineda on 17 August 2013, at UFC Fight Night 26. He won the back-and-forth fight via unanimous decision.

Brandão faced Dustin Poirier on 28 December 2013, at UFC 168. There was some bad blood between the two that was evident during the staredown at the weigh-in, with Poirier claiming Brandão had threatened to "stab me in the neck." Brandão weighed in at 153 pounds, seven pounds over the accepted 146-pound limit for a featherweight non-title fight. Brandão would continue to cut weight and weighed in an hour later, but could only get down to 151.5 pounds. He was fined 25 percent of his purse, but the bout went on as scheduled. He lost the fight via TKO in the first round.

Brandão was expected to face Will Chope on 23 March 2014, at UFC Fight Night 38. However, Chope was released from UFC when documents were released that showed Chope was discharged from the U.S. Air Force for domestic violence towards his ex-wife.

Brandão was expected to face promotional newcomer Brian Ortega on 31 May 2014, at The Ultimate Fighter Brazil 3 Finale. However, Brandão pulled out of the bout in the days leading up to the event citing an injury. Due to the late nature of the change, officials did not try to find a replacement and Ortega was pulled from the card as well.

Brandão faced Conor McGregor on 19 July 2014, at UFC Fight Night 46, replacing an injured Cole Miller. Brandão lost the fight via TKO in the first round.

Brandão was expected to face Jimy Hettes on 31 January 2015, at UFC 183. However, the fight was canceled right before the event started, as Hettes passed out backstage. He was taken to a local hospital for precautionary reasons. Subsequently, the bout with Hettes was rescheduled for 18 April 2015, at UFC on Fox 15. Brandão won the fight due to a doctor stoppage between the first and second round.

Brandão faced Katsunori Kikuno on 27 September 2015, at UFC Fight Night 75. He dropped his opponent in the bout's opening seconds and followed up with a flurry of punches earning a TKO stoppage. The win also earned him his first Performance of the Night bonus award.

Brandão faced Brian Ortega on 2 January 2016, at UFC 195. After controlling the first two rounds with his striking, Brandão lost the fight via submission in the third round.

On 15 January 2016, it was announced that Brandao had tested positive for marijuana stemming from an in-competition test on 2 January. On 28 April 2016, Brandao was released from the UFC on account of a felony arrest. In ten fights under the promotion, he held a record of 6-4.

Fight Nights Global
On 20 October 2016, Brandão signed a contract to fight Russian mixed martial artist Rasul Mirzaev. However, on 3 December, Mirzaev pulled out of the bout for unknown reason. Brandão defeated Murad Machaev on 28 January 2017, at Fight Nights 58.

Absolute Championship Akhmat

Diego faced Salman Zhamaldaev on 26 March 2021 at ACA 120: Oliveira vs. Bibulatov. After tripping Salman in the second round, Diego delivered an illegal soccer kick to the head of Salman while his knee was on the ground. Salman couldn't continue, hence it was announced as an DQ loss for Diego.

Diego rematched Salman Zhamaldaev at ACA 127: Kerefov vs. Albaskhanov on 28 August 2021. Brandão lost the bout via majority decision.

Diego faced Alexey Polpudnikov at ACA 134: Bagov vs. Koshkin on December 17, 2021. Brandão lost the bout via TKO in the third round.

Diego faced Bibert Tumenov on February 26, 2022 at ACA 136: Bukuev vs Akopyan. He lost the bout via body shot KO in the second round.

Following leaving ACA, Diego faced Oleg Lichkovakha on Ural FC 1 on July 1, 2022. He won the bout via TKO in the second round with knees and punches.

Championships and accomplishments 
Ultimate Fighting Championship
The Ultimate Fighter 14 Featherweight Tournament Winner
Fight of the Night (One time)
Submission of the Night (One time)
Performance of the Night (One time)
First ever Brazilian to win The Ultimate Fighter
Sherdog
'Submission of the Year' 2017 - Top 5 List #5  vs. Murad Machaev

Mixed martial arts record

|-
|Win
|align=center|27–20
|Matt Wagy
|KO (flying knee)
|AFL: Invincible 2023
|
|align=center|1
|align=center|3:12
|Hollywood, Florida, United States
|
|-
|Win
|align=center|26–20
|Oleg Lichkovakha
|TKO (knee and punches)
|Ural FC 1
|
|align=center|2
|align=center|3:37
|Perm, Russia
|
|-
|Loss
|align=center|25–20
|Bibert Tumenov
|KO (punch to the body)
|ACA 136: Bukuev vs Akopyan
|
|align=center|2
|align=center|4:56
|Moscow, Russia
|
|-
|Loss
|align=center|25–19
| Alexey Polpudnikov
| TKO (punches)
| ACA 134: Bagov vs. Koshkin
| 
| align=center|3 
| align=center|0:54
| Krasnodar, Russia
| 
|-
|Loss
|align=center|25–18
|Salman Zhamaldaev
|Decision (majority)
|ACA 127: Kerefov vs. Albaskhanov
|
|align=center|3
|align=center|5:00
|Krasnodar, Russia
|
|-
|Loss
|align=center|25–17
|Salman Zhamaldaev
|DQ (illegal kick)
|ACA 120: Froes vs. Khasbulaev
|
|align=center|2
|align=center|1:05
|Saint Petersburg, Russia
|
|-
|Loss
|align=center|25–16
|Dzhihad Yunusov
|Decision (unanimous)
|ACA 112: Oliveira vs. Dudaev
|
|align=center|3
|align=center|5:00
|Grozny, Russia
|
|-
|Loss
|align=center|25–15
|Marat Balaev
|Decision (split)
|ACA 103: Yagshimuradov vs. Butorin
|
|align=center|3
|align=center|5:00
|St Petersburg, Russia
|
|-
|Win
|align=center|25–14
|Dzhihad Yunusov
|Decision (split)
|ACA 100: Zhamaldaev vs. Froes 2
|
|align=center|3
|align=center|5:00
|Grozny, Russia
|
|-
|Loss
|align=center|24–14
|Marcin Held
|Decision (unanimous)
|ACA 96: Goncharov vs. Johnson
|
|align=center|3
|align=center|5:00
|Lodz, Poland
|  
|-
|Win
|align=center|24–13
|Vener Galiev
|TKO (doctor stoppage)
|RCC 5
|
|align=center|1
|align=center| 0:50
|Yekaterinburg, Russia
|
|-
|Loss
|align=center|23–13
|Daron Cruickshank
|KO (flying knee)
|Rizin 13
|
|align=center|2
|align=center|0:17
|Saitama, Japan
|
|-
|Win
|align=center|23–12
|Satoru Kitaoka
|KO (punches)
|Rizin 11
|
|align=center|1
|align=center|1:38
|Saitama, Japan
|
|-
|Loss
|align=center|22–12
|Akhmed Aliev
|TKO (retirement)
|Fight Nights Global 73: Aliev vs. Brandão
|
|align=center| 2
|align=center| 3:34
|Kaspiysk, Russia
|
|-
|Win
|align=center|22–11
|Vener Galiev
|KO (punches)
|Fight Nights Global 67: Brandão vs. Galiev
|
|align=center|1
|align=center| 0:39
|Yekaterinburg, Russia
|
|-
|Win
|align=center|21–11
|Murad Machaev
|Submission (armbar)
|Fight Nights Global 58: Brandão vs. Machaev
|
|align=center|2
|align=center| 0:58
|Kaspiysk, Russia
|
|-
|Loss
|align=center|20–11
|Brian Ortega
|Submission (triangle choke)
|UFC 195
|
|align=center|3
|align=center| 3:58
|Las Vegas, Nevada, United States
|
|-
|Win
|align=center|20–10
|Katsunori Kikuno
| TKO (punches)
|UFC Fight Night: Barnett vs. Nelson
|
|align=center|1
|align=center|0:28
|Saitama, Japan
|
|-
|Win
|align=center|19–10
|Jimy Hettes
|TKO (doctor stoppage)
|UFC on Fox: Machida vs. Rockhold
|
|align=center|1
|align=center| 5:00
|Newark, New Jersey, United States
|
|-
|Loss
|align=center|18–10
|Conor McGregor
|TKO (punches)
|UFC Fight Night: McGregor vs. Brandao
|
|align=center|1
|align=center|4:05
|Dublin, Ireland
|
|-
|Loss
|align=center|18–9
|Dustin Poirier
|KO (punches)
|UFC 168
|
|align=center|1
|align=center|4:54
|Las Vegas, Nevada, United States
|
|-
|Win
|align=center|18–8
|Daniel Pineda
|Decision (unanimous)
|UFC Fight Night: Shogun vs. Sonnen
|
|align=center|3
|align=center|5:00
|Boston, Massachusetts, United States
|
|-
|Win
|align=center|17–8
|Pablo Garza
|Submission (arm-triangle choke)
|UFC on Fuel TV: Mousasi vs. Latifi
|
|align=center|1
|align=center|3:27
|Stockholm, Sweden
|
|-
|Win
|align=center|16–8
|Joey Gambino
|Decision (unanimous)
|UFC 153
|
|align=center|3
|align=center|5:00
|Rio de Janeiro, Brazil
|
|-
|Loss
|align=center|15–8
|Darren Elkins
|Decision (unanimous)
|UFC 146
|
|align=center|3
|align=center|5:00
|Las Vegas, Nevada, United States
|
|-
|Win
|align=center|15–7
|Dennis Bermudez
|Submission (armbar)
|The Ultimate Fighter: Team Bisping vs. Team Miller Finale
|
|align=center|1
|align=center|4:51
|Las Vegas, Nevada, United States
|
|-
|Win
|align=center|14–7
|Nick Buschman
|KO (flying knee and punches)
|ECSC - Friday Night Fights 2
|
|align=center|1
|align=center|2:14
|Clovis, New Mexico, United States
|
|-
|Win
|align=center|13–7
|Richard Villa
|Submission (rear-naked choke)
|Jackson's MMA Series 3
|
|align=center|2
|align=center|3:31
|Albuquerque, New Mexico, United States
|
|-
|Win
|align=center|12–7
|Michael Casteel
|KO (punch)
|ECSC - Evolution 1
|
|align=center|1
|align=center|0:30
|Clovis, New Mexico, United States
|
|-
|Loss
|align=center|11-7
|Ururahy Rodrigues
|Decision (unanimous)
|UWC-Judgement Day
|
|align=center|3
|align=center|5:00
|Fairfax, Virginia, United States
|
|-
|Win
|align=center|11–6
|Derek Campos
|Decision (split)
|KOK 8 - The Uprising
|
|align=center|3
|align=center|5:00
|Austin, Texas, United States
|
|-
|Loss
|align=center|10–6
|Gert Kocani
|TKO (punches)
|RIE 2 - Battle at the Burg 2
|
|align=center|2
|align=center|3:30
|Penn Laird, Virginia, United States
|
|-
|Loss
|align=center|10–5
|Ran Weathers
|TKO (punch)
|SWC 7 - Discountenance
|
|align=center|1
|align=center|2:56
|Frisco, Texas, United States
|
|-
|Win
|align=center|10–4
|Fernando Vieira
|TKO (punches)
|Mr. Cage 2
|
|align=center|2
|align=center|3:31
|Manaus, Brazil
|
|-
|Win
|align=center|9–4
|James King
|Submission (rear-naked choke)
|KOK 5 - Season's Beatings
|
|align=center|1
|align=center|1:53
|Austin, Texas, United States
|
|-
|Loss
|align=center|8–4
|Matt Veach
|TKO (injury)
|Pro Battle MMA - Immediate Impact
|
|align=center|2
|align=center|1:28
|Springdale, Arkansas, United States
|
|-
|Win
|align=center|8–3
|Brian Foster
|KO (punches)
|TAP Entertainment - Fight Night
|
|align=center|1
|align=center|1:34
|Sallisaw, Oklahoma, United States
|
|-
|Win
|align=center|7–3
|Orlean Smith
|TKO (punches)
|Amazon Tribal Kombat 1
|
|align=center|1
|align=center|3:18
|Manaus, Brazil
|
|-
|Loss
|align=center|6–3
|Jorge Clay
|Decision (unanimous)
|Amazon Challenge 2
|
|align=center|3
|align=center|5:00
|Manaus, Brazil
|
|-
|Win
|align=center|6–2
|Fabiano Silva
|Decision (split)
|Amazon Challenge
|
|align=center|3
|align=center|5:00
|Manaus, Brazil
|
|-
|Win
|align=center|5–2
|Juarez Harles
|KO (punch)
|Amazon Challenge
|
|align=center|1
|align=center|1:27
|Manaus, Brazil
|
|-
|Win
|align=center|4–2
|Arilson Paixao
|TKO (punches)
|Cassino Fight 4
|
|align=center|1
|align=center|2:11
|Manaus, Brazil
|
|-
|Loss
|align=center|3–2
|Ronys Torres
|TKO (punches)
|Cassino Fight 3
|
|align=center|2
|align=center|N/A
|Brazil
|
|-
|Loss
|align=center|3–1
|Daniel Trindade
|Submission (rear-naked choke)
|Roraima Combat 3
|
|align=center|3
|align=center|2:25
|Boa Vista, Brazil
|
|-
|Win
|align=center|3–0
|Jorge Dalton
|TKO (punches)
|Manaus Moderna Fight
|
|align=center|1
|align=center|N/A
|Manaus, Brazil
|
|-
|Win
|align=center|2–0
|Elifrank Cariolano
|TKO (punches)
|Cassino Fight
|
|align=center|1
|align=center|3:41
|Manaus, Brazil
|
|-
|Win
|align=center|1–0
|Michel Addario
|Submission (choke)
|Mega Combat Vale Tudo
|
|align=center|3
|align=center|3:20
|Belém, Brazil
|

Mixed martial arts exhibition record

| Win
| align=center| 3–0
| Bryan Caraway
| KO (punches)
| The Ultimate Fighter: Team Bisping vs. Team Miller
|  (airdate)
| align=center| 1
| align=center| 4:15
| Las Vegas, Nevada, United States
| 
|-
| Win
| align=center| 2–0
| Steven Siler
| KO (punches)
| The Ultimate Fighter: Team Bisping vs. Team Miller
|  (airdate)
| align=center| 1
| align=center| 0:30
| Las Vegas, Nevada, United States
| 
|-
| Win
| align=center| 1–0
| Jesse Newell
| KO (punches)
| The Ultimate Fighter: Team Bisping vs. Team Miller
|  (airdate)
| align=center| 1
| align=center| 0:47
| Las Vegas, Nevada, United States
|

See also
 List of male mixed martial artists

References

External links
 
 

1987 births
Living people
Brazilian male mixed martial artists
Featherweight mixed martial artists
Mixed martial artists utilizing Muay Thai
Mixed martial artists utilizing Brazilian jiu-jitsu
Brazilian Muay Thai practitioners
Brazilian practitioners of Brazilian jiu-jitsu
People awarded a black belt in Brazilian jiu-jitsu
Brazilian sportspeople in doping cases
Doping cases in mixed martial arts
People from Manaus
Ultimate Fighting Championship male fighters
Sportspeople from Fortaleza